The Social Life of Information is a 2000 book by John Seely Brown (the former Chief Scientist of Xerox Corporation and director of Xerox PARC) and Paul Duguid
(Adjunct professor at the UC Berkeley School of Information), which discusses recently developed practices in the transmission of information in social and business contexts.

The authors argue that information technology needs to be considered in a broad context that includes the entirety of society and social resources, in contrast to the narrow focus on information that tends to be the framework of such technology – what the authors criticize as "tunnel design". That is, increased technological delivery of information does not in and of itself contribute to a better future. The text, in part, analyzes examples of the office world's adoption of technology, offering a differentiated rather than an unquestioningly affirmative view of the effects.

User agents 
Serving as an early example of the ambiguous utility of software to human, the authors discuss software known as autonomous agents which manipulate information. Different forms of such agents include information broker, product brokering, merchant brokering, and negotiation. The authors use an example of information brokering using the Macintosh program named Sherlock that searched for the word "knobot" via the Internet. Product brokering would be an example of an online bookstore sending a person an email about a book for sale based on the previous types of books the customer bought. Merchant brokering, now widely practiced,  consists of finding the best price for a product. For example, eBay allows users, not necessarily in the same location, to buy new, used, or refurbished products through an auction, at a fixed price, or through negotiation.

This book has been republished in 2002 with a new introduction, by the Harvard Business School Press.

Reviews 
Reviews of the book from professional journals include:
Gleason, Sandra (Summer 2001). Planning for Higher Education. 29(4): pp. 38-39.
O'Malley, Lisa (2002), in Journal of Marketing. 66(4): pp. 124-127. .
Watson-Boone, Peter (2001), in Portal: Libraries and the Academy. 1(2): pp. 180-12. .
The Library Quarterly. 2001. 71(1): pp. 94-95.

See also 
 Knowledge management
 John Seely Brown
 Information ecology
 Information society

Notes

References 

Information science
2000 non-fiction books